Majnun (rus.  Мажнун uzb. Majnun) is a 2016 Uzbek melodrama film directed by Johongir Ahmedov and produced by Diyor Mahkamov. The film stars Ulugʻbek Qodirov, Asal Shodiyeva and Elyor Mahkamov.

Plot
Majnun The film is about the life of a famous football player named Sardor Kamilov. All the journalists are interested in the whereabouts  Footballers his fans thought that he was dead. The young beautiful journalist searches for Sardor for an interview. Sardor, who initially disagreed, agreed on the condition that he not write to the newspaper. The journalist, who interviewed Sardor, tells the girl Sardor's secrets to her friend. The journalist's friend publishes Sardor's secrets in the newspaper. Upon learning of this, the Sardor journalist was offended by the girl. The Sardor was very upset when he saw the information about him in the newspaper. The upset Sardor climbs the mountain again. A family in the mountains is attacked by a pack of wolves. Sardor rushes to their aid and Sardor is strangled by a pack of wolves.

Cast 
 Ulugʻbek Qodirov: Sardor Komilov
 Asal Shodiyeva: Iroda
 Elyor Mahkamov: Nodir
 Matyoqub Matjonov: Asat cho’pon 
 Rano Shodiyeva:?
 Diyor Mahkamov: Shokirjon
 Muhammad Iso Abdulhairov: Qilich
 Shorira Ismoilova:?
 Anjela Esimbetova: Zebo
 Asqar Hikmatov: Qodir
 Mirshod Atavullayev: Jamshid
 Elyor Nosirov: ustoz
 Radjabova Azisa : Afruza

Sound post-production 
Sound director Doniyor Agzamov. Sound design Doniyor Agzamov. CineLab sound post-production complex.  Dolby Digital 5.1

Music 
The music for the film "Majnun" was written Doniyor Agzamov.

The soundtrack of the film "Majnun" was performed by the famous Uzbek singer :uz:Shohruhxon

Income 
The film premiered on February 19, 2016, in Uzbekistan. This film was one of the most watched films in Uzbekistan.The budget and gross of the film have not been announced.

References

External links
 Official trailer